The Division of Ecological Restoration (DER) is a Division of the Massachusetts Department of Fish and Game within the Executive Office of Energy and Environmental Affairs. DER was created in 2009 with the merger of the Riverways and Wetlands Restoration Programs (formally within the Massachusetts Office of Coastal Zone Management). DER coordinates ecological restoration to improve ecological condition and to restore important ecosystem services that improve the quality of life for all Massachusetts citizens.

The Riverways Program (MGL Chapter 21A Section 8) has been maintained within DER and coordinates outreach and technical assistance to support watershed conservation and protection.

The Division and partners facilitate capital-based projects including (but not limited to) dam removal and culvert replacement with the goal of restoring aquatic habitats (e.g. salt marshes)
and ecosystems across the state. These projects support commercial and recreational fisheries and provide many other benefits such as reduced flooding, improved water quality, carbon sequestration and increased public safety.

Ecological restoration is a core component of the Commonwealth of Massachusetts efforts to build habitat resiliency to better allow fish and wildlife to adapt to climate change – including sea level rise, elevated water temperatures, and increased floods and periods of drought.

Beth Lambert currently serves as the Director of the Division of Ecological Restoration. The founding director was Tim Purinton, who served in this role from 2009-2017.

Philosophy
DER espouses a comprehensive, holistic approach to restoration, that prioritizes ecosystems over habitats.
DER places an emphasis on restoring ecological processes, rather than species specific habitats, focusing on implementation of restoration actions at a watershed scale.
DER staff identifies the most detrimental stressors in the larger watershed context and coordinates restoration actions to improve conditions in partnership with local organizations.
DER bases its programs on engaging and working with stakeholders in the communities to maximize impact and stewardship.

References

External links
Mass Division of Ecological Restoration
Mass Department of Fish and Game
Society for Ecological Restoration

Ecology
Environmental agencies
Environmental agencies in the United States
Environment of Massachusetts